During 1991 Pakistan engaged simultaneously in the preservation of democracy, liberalization of its economy, and a reorientation of foreign policy. The year saw significant initiatives on all three fronts, but these encountered equally significant obstacles. The interplay of light and shadows left the people rather confused about the direction of their lives and the destiny of their country. The year really began in October 1990 with two events that continue to cast their shadows over the nation. One was the suspension of U.S. aid (October 1) and the other was the disputed national elections (October 24); the fallout from both these events largely dominated the national debate and determined the national agenda in 1991.

Confrontational Politics with a Ray of Hope 
Peaceful and constitutional transfer of power is not the norm in Pakistan but this did take place on November 6, 1990, when Mian Nawaz Sharif was inducted as prime minister. For the first time in Pakistan's history, the ruling party (Islamic Democratic Alliance, commonly IJI1) enjoyed more than a two-thirds majority in the National Assembly, and it was also the first time that the same party ruled at the center as well as in all four provinces. Though the opposition Peoples Democratic Alliance (PDA) had charged that the elections were stolen,2 its leader, Benazir Bhutto, departing from traditional tactics, did not take to the streets. She decided to work within the democratic framework, and Nawaz Sharif promised to reciprocate. But this restraint did not last long. Presidential references to special tribunals to look into charges of corruption and misuse of power by Bhutto and some of her ministers, the involvement of her husband in criminal cases, and the persecution of her party's rank and file in Sindh by the Jam Sadiq government vitiated the political climate. In rage against a ruthless establishment, Bhutto took the fight from Parliament to the people. She denounced the elections of October 1990 as totally rigged, described the Parliament as "bogus," and since April 1991 she has conducted a relentless campaign to oust the Nawaz Sharif government. She did not even seem averse to a military takeover. Nawaz responded in an Independence Day speech on August 14 in Lahore that was full of anger, hatred, and threats. The confrontation kept the political climate charged, the people on edge, and the country buzzing with rumors about a change in government either through a military takeover or a palace revolution The bickering, infighting, and the seemingly chaotic Pakistani political scene in 1991 should not cause undue alarm. It is the Pakistani style of politics, and if no extraneous intervention takes place, it may produce corrective action from within the system. Moreover, the heat and dust of confrontational politics should not make one oblivious to an interesting prospect-the beginning of a two-party system in Pakistan where there are more political parties than there are shades of opinion. The elections of 1988 and 1990 have reduced most parties to be, at best, locally influential. The two political alliances-the IJI and the PDA, with the Muslim League and the Pakistan People's Party as their respective standard bearers-have, emerged as the main contestants for power. Contrary to common wisdom, the PDA did not suffer a humiliating de- feat in the 1990 elections in terms of popular support. In the National Assembly elections, the difference in the popular vote received by the two alliances was less than one percent (IJI-37.27%, PDA-36.65%), although this was not reflected in the number of seats won (IJI: 105, PDA: 45).3 Not only were the two alliances well balanced in their vote banks but their programs were also complimentary. The ideological confrontation of the 1970s and 1980s was over. Both agreed on a domestic agenda of liberal democracy and market economy although they used different rhetoric and slogans to satisfy their respective constituencies. Even on foreign policy issues, the stances of the IJI and the PDA became identical after the IJI shed its anti-India, anti-U.S. rhetoric and came around to supporting a political settlement in Afghanistan. In fact, the two-party system successfully operated in the Punjab where the two alliances together captured 88% of the votes cast in the election. The provincial government and the opposition also developed a working relationship.  The IJI record as a ruling coalition has been a mixed one. The government took credit for the passage of the Shariat Bill in May and the Twelfth Amendment to the Constitution in July. The Shariat Bill declared the Quran and the Sunnah as the law of the land, not just the guideline. This could render legislatures superfluous but they were retained as the sole instrument of legislation. The opposition pointed out this contradiction and charged that a theocracy was being established; minority and women's groups also protested. The prime minister tried to disarm the critics by proclaiming he was not a fundamentalist but satisfied neither the moderates nor the fundamentalists. The Twelfth Amendment provided for special courts for speedy trial in cases of a heinous nature. Its provisions for suppression of fundamental rights and extension of police powers drew the wrath of the opposition, but the amendment so far has not been used by the government to persecute its opponents. The Nawaz Sharif government successfully tackled two very contentious issues that had waited to be resolved for more than 17 years-the allocations of Indus waters and the distribution of revenues between the federation and the provinces. The agreements were reached on both counts in the Council of Common Interest in March. But the government was vulnerable on several fronts. Nawaz Sharif found it difficult to hold his disparate coalition together; political expediency forced him to expand the cabinet to a record number of 48 ministers, ministers of state, and advisors. The law and order situation remained alarming in the country, particularly in Sindh. The Kalashnikov culture refused to be subdued and terrorism continued to stalk the land. The kidnapping for ransom of three Japanese students and two Chinese engineers in Sindh (they were subsequently released); bomb blasts in different parts of the country, notably Karachi; attacks on working journalists; and the murder of General Fazl-i- Haq, ex-governor of the Northwest Frontier Province (NWFP), were some indications of the pervasiveness of violence. The government also failed to control the rampant corruption in the bureaucracy and in the ety at large. In September Pakistan was rocked by the Cooperative Societies scandal in the ab in which some two million people lost deposits of Rs 17 billion (about US$700 million). Coming as it did on the heels of the BCCI collapse, confidence in the financial institutions of the country was shattered and the credibility of the government seriously eroded.

However, on one front at least, the government could breathe easier: a change of guard in the army on August 16 retired General Mirza Aslam Beg as chief of the army staff (COAS) and placed General Asif Nawaz in charge. In his order of the day to the troops, the new COAS said: "Let the elected representatives do their job while we concentrate on acquiring ever greater professional excellence." He also declared that "the army must have nothing to do with politics."4 Thus, the democratic polity, though fragile, survived the year.

Economic Liberalization 
The financial year (June 1990-July 1991) was a difficult and eventful one for Pakistan's economy, with the suspension of U.S. aid and the Gulf War exerting immense pressure. U.S. aid for 1990-91 was reduced to $224 mil- lion-almost one-half of the 1989-90 aid figure. Even this reduced sum was suspended in October 1990, and finally, on October 1, 1991, the aid relationship was terminated altogether except for $500 million already in the pipeline. Increases in the prices of oil and petroleum products and the ban on exports to Iraq during the Gulf crisis caused a loss of about $600 million, and the repatriation of Pakistani workers from Kuwait and Iraq resulted in a shortfall of $100 million in remittances from the Gulf.5 This put a serious strain on the balance of payments and the budget. However, unlike the political scene, which remained depressing in 1991, the economy showed resilience and vitality during 1990-91. The GDP grew at a healthy rate of 5.6%, exports rose by 22%, and direct foreign investment by 15%. Stock market capitalization moved from Rs. 48.6 billion in June 1990 to Rs.92.3 billion in October 1991.6 The balance of payments situation was also eased by the inflow of about $650 million due to the relaxation of foreign exchange regulations. Since Pakistan had met all the conditionalities of the IMF and the World Bank, it received $1.168 billion from these agencies under various categories. Despite these encouraging indicators, Pakistan's economy in 1991 remained basically vulnerable. Its external debt on December 31, 1990, ac- cording to the World Bank Report for that year, stood at $18 billion. In addition, there was a domestic debt of Rs.400 billion, a balance of payments deficit of $2.1 billion or 4.6% of GNP, and a budgetary deficit of 5.2% of GDP. Unemployment during 1990-91 stood at 13.45% and inflation was 12.29%.7 According to the finance minister's budget speech on May 30, debt servicing during 1991-92 would consume 53% and defense expenditures 47% of revenue receipts.8 Thus, expenditures on development programs, public administration, and social sectors such as health and education would have to be met from external sources. This mounting debt liability and a population growth rate of 3.1% make the economic situation grave. To remedy the resource gap, it has become imperative to restructure the tax system and plug the leaks in revenue collection due to corruption. Similarly, a reallocation of revenue on a more rational basis is called for. Pakistan's population-32 million in 1947-reached the staggering figure of 113 million in January 1991. Family planning facilities reach hardly 20% of the population, and that is only in urban areas. A more determined effort is needed to tackle these pressing issues, but the economic policies pursued in 1991 failed to address them. The government made a determined effort to attract foreign investment capital. In November it organized a grand international investment conference in Islamabad, part of a $10 million promotion effort. The response was encouraging and the government hoped to attract a billion dollars in foreign investment during the 1991-92 financial year. But international competition for investment capital has become very sharp, and while the economic reforms of 1991 have made Pakistan very attractive to foreign entrepreneurs, without political stability and a satisfactory law and order situation they might not be tempted. In a complete reversal of the economic philosophy of the 1970s and 1980s, the government moved to base the economy on the free market mechanism. A series of reforms were carried out to accelerate the pace of economic growth through deregulation and privatization.

(1) In December 1990 the government announced a new industrial policy package in which its sanction was no longer required for the establishment of new industrial units, irrespective of size, sponsor, and location. The only exceptions were alcoholic beverages, arms and ammunition, high explosives, and security printing. Thus, industries previously forbidden to the private sector such as electricity generating, airlines, shipping, highway construction, telecommunications, etc., were opened to private enterprise. Permission was granted to two private airlines; one, a cargo airline, became operational in 1991 and the other was still negotiating routes and rates. Liberal tax and tariff incentives were offered for new industries, particularly those set up in rural and less developed areas, These included tax holidays for three to eight years and 50-100% exemption from customs duty on imports of machinery.

(2) In February the foreign exchange regime was liberalized, enabling resident and non-resident Pakistanis to maintain foreign currency accounts in the country. Any amount of foreign exchange could be brought in or taken out by anyone without declaration. Investors could directly contract foreign debt on whatever terms they deemed appropriate. Export trade was thrown open to foreign firms, and import licensing for most items was discontinued. These measures, coupled with a flexible exchange rate for the rupee and a liberal trade policy, brought Pakistan closer to free convertibility.

(3) More ambitious was the program to denationalize all public sector industrial units and financial institutions, with a few exceptions. Initially, two banks were transferred from government to private management. (Interestingly, the management of one was transferred to its 7,325 employees who pooled their resources to acquire 51 % of the equity of the bank-an unprecedented step toward "people's capitalism" or corporate democracy.) In August two more banks and two development finance institutions were offered to the private sector. In addition, permission was granted to open ten new banks in the private sector, but none became operational in 1991. The government had earmarked 125 industrial units for privatization, and in August it offered 101 of these for sale. Bids for only 23 units were found to match the reserved price and these were transferred to private management.

(4) Along with the privatization of industrial and financial sectors, an ambitious program for the development of agriculture and rural areas was chalked out. It comprised farm-to-market roads, rural electrification, rural industrialization, modernization of agricultural management and production techniques, and environmental protection.

There was a national consensus on liberalization and privatization of the economy and making it responsible for market mechanisms, but there was severe criticism of the way the government went about it. The opposition and many independent economists accused the government of undue haste and secrecy. Offering such a large number of industrial and financial units for privatization at one time was likened to selling the family silver at throwaway prices. They were also critical of the secrecy in which the units were evaluated and their reserved prices fixed. The process lacked "transparency," and they charged and accused the government of favoritism and of creating monopolies. The critics were apprehensive that such rapid and ill-planned schemes might return the country to the social tensions and turmoil of the late 1960s and to the demand for the renationalization of these units. The critics advocated a slower and phased program and more objective criteria for economic decision-making. They also asked the government to fully work out measures to protect the more vulnerable groups in society who could not compete in a free market. Since there was not that much investment capital floating around the country, the response to privatization was limited. This automatically slowed down the process and met one of the points of criticism; it will also help the government work out a more carefully structured process.

New Directions in Foreign Policy 
For almost a decade Pakistan was on the center stage of world politics. But the eclipse of the Soviet Union and the end of the Cold War saw it pushed into the wings. The sudden, swift, and sweeping changes in the global political system and the emerging realities at the regional level created a feeling of unease and isolation in Pakistan. The year saw the country hurrying to review and reassess its foreign policy priorities and its diplomatic options, and the signals emanating from Islamabad lacked clarity and cohesion. At one level, Pakistan was seeking to push a political settlement in Afghanistan, improve its ties with the United States, and mend fences with India; at another level, it seemed to be returning to its Islamic and regional moorings and to be seeking alternate linkages. 

Pakistan made a ninety-degree turn on Afghanistan. In a crucial meeting of the Afghan Cell on April 3, chaired by President Ghulam Ishaq Khan, an intra-establishment consensus was reached to go all out for a political settlement as soon as possible. Time, it was felt, was running out for Pakistan. The inability of the Afghan resistance to dislodge the Kabul regime, the prospect of the continuing burden of Afghan refugees, and the apprehension that opportunities to establish close links with the new Central Asian republics might be missed weighed heavily on the decision-makers in Islamabad.

On May 21, 1991, sensing the new mood in Pakistan, U.N. Secretary-General Perez de Cuellar presented a five-point peace plan for Afghanistan that seeks to evolve, through an intra-Afghan dialogue, an impartial transitional mechanism leading to the establishment of a broad-based government in Kabul. The plan was endorsed by all the major actors in the Afghan conflict except three fundamentalist resistance leaders who still believe that jihad (holy war) is the only way to establish an Islamic government in Afghanistan. Pakistan (and Iran) moved ahead with the U.N. plan, hoping that as the momentum built up these leaders would not want to be left out of the political settlement. 

A broad consensus emerged after two rounds of tripartite talks in Islamabad (July) and Tehran (August) between Pakistan, Iran, and the moderate Afghan resistance groups, including the Iran-based Hizb-i-Wahdat. The "negative symmetry" announced on September 13 by the U.S. and the Soviet Union and the reported assurance by the Soviets to Perez de Cuellar that they would not insist on a role for controversial personalities in the peace process and in the transitional mechanism further brightened prospects for a political settlement. Pakistan's Foreign Secretary Shaharyar Khan, in a BBC interview in September, indicated a time frame of three months for the peace process to be finalized. 

The hardliners in the Afghan resistance vitiated, if not derailed the peace process by launching attacks for the capture of Gardez and Jalalabad, but the disunity in their ranks and the Kabul air force turned the attacks into fiascos. Gulbuddin Hekmatyar issued a threat to turn Afghanistan into a Lebanon and to destabilize both Iran and Pakistan if a government of communists and so-called nationalist Afghans was imposed on the Afghan people.10 However, Pakistan remained determined not to allow the peace process to become hostage to any leader's whims and personal ambitions. Peace negotiations between the moderate Afghan resistance leaders and Soviet and Russian authorities continued, first in New York (October) and then in Moscow (November) where an agreement was reached for the transfer of power in Kabul to an interim Islamic government that would hold elections within two years under the aegis of the U.N. and the Organization of Islamic Countries (OIC). A joint commission was named to implement the Moscow accord. 

After Afghanistan, the issue that most engaged attention of Islamabad was the bilateral relationship with the United States. For Pakistan, the news from Washington in 1991 was seldom comforting. On October 1, 1990, all U.S. aid, training, and transfer of weapons and technology (except economic aid in the pipeline) were suspended when President Bush did not certify the nuclear virginity of Pakistan as required under the Pressler Amendment. The U.S. charged that Pakistan had raised the enrichment of uranium to weapons grade level, which Pakistan denied. Aid remained on hold until October 1, 1991, when it was finally terminated.

The IJI, during the 1990 election campaign, made U.S. aid suspension a major issue, accusing the PPP of maneuvering the cutoff and generating anti-American sentiment. Anti-U.S. feelings grew during the Gulf War when the Jamaat-i-Islami and other fundamentalist groups took a pro-Iraq stance. Most Americans were evacuated, and for several months the country remained on the list of "unfavorable nations with a tendency toward hostility for the U.S. and its interests." The Nawaz Sharif government tried to contain the damage by implementing all the Security Council resolutions on Iraq and sending 11,000 troops to Saudi Arabia. But an intra- establishment consensus on the Gulf situation was missing. Some statements of the COAS, General Beg, appeared to be supportive and appreciative of Iraq. Because of these divergent voices, Pakistan reaped no rewards for supporting the "allied" cause in the Gulf-such as the massive debt write-offs for Syria and Eqypt, or even the opportunity to buy surplus U.S. military stores that were offered for sale at throwaway prices after the war. To re-establish the channels of communication, the government sent a high-powered delegation to Washington in June 1991, led by Senate Chairman Wasim Sajjad. Before the group departed, Nawaz Sharif made two moves. He announced (earlier than usual) the appointment of a new COAS, and in a speech on June 6 he put forth a seven-point plan for an "equitable and non-discriminatory solution of the nuclear proliferation problem in South Asia." In essence, he called for a five-nation conference (Pakistan, India, China, USSR, and U.S.) to deliberate the nuclear and related security issues in the region. 

The Wasim delegation met with top-level policy makers, concerned congressional leaders, and media representatives. The meetings helped take the chill out of Pakistan-U.S. relations but could not bridge the gap in perceptions. The Pakistanis were surprised to see the area of American concerns in South Asia widened by the inclusion of the Missile Technology Control Regime (MTCR) and the alleged Pakistani intervention in Indian Punjab and Indian-held Kashmir. The unfinished dialogue in Washington was resumed in Islamabad in November. General Joseph P. Hoar, C-in-C of the U.S. Central Command, and Undersecretary of State for International Security Affairs Reginald Bartholomew held in-depth talks covering the whole range of bilateral relations. Goodwill was expressed by both sides but there was no consensus on basic issues. Pakistanis were irritated by the selective American approach in the region, noting the failure of the U.S. Congress to bring India within the purview of the Pressler Amendment. The high-level negotiations between India and the U.S. on establishing a security arrangement in South Asia were also extensively reported and commented upon in the Pakistani media. Thus, Pakistan-U.S. relations in 1991 were highly strained and marked by suspicion and distrust. Neither side was happy over this steep decline, but both could go only a limited distance to reach an amicable settlement. Bush could not avoid his obligations under the Pressler law and Nawaz Sharif could not fly in the face of public opinion in Pakistan. In a Gallup poll in June, 77% of the respondents favored rejection of American aid rather than giving up the nuclear program, and 87% were in favor of Pakistan making nuclear weapons.-"

Among all the changes at the global and regional levels, what did not change for Pakistan was the adversarial relationship with India. But though tension remained high and the most bloody border clash in recent years took place in the Poonch Sector in September, the two countries managed to check the drift toward war. The Kashmiris' right of self-determination, delimitation of borders in Siachin, construction of the Wullar Barrage on the Jhelum River in Indian-held Kashmir, demarcation of boundaries in Sircreek in the Rann of Kutch, and disarmament issues occupied the Indo-Pak agenda. There was no dearth of the usual accusations and recriminations but the channels of communication were kept open and busy. The two prime ministers met informally twice and reiterated their determination to resolve the issues through bilateral negotiations. Five rounds of foreign secretaries' meetings and two of defense secretaries resulted in agreements or near agreements on all issues except Kashmir and disarmament. "We raise the Kashmir issue every time we meet. The Indians don't respond," complained the foreign secretary. 12 However, dis- armament, including the nuclear issue, was discussed for the first time at the fifth round of talks in October. Indian Foreign Secretary Muchkund Dubey described India as a "nuclear weapon-capable state," and he asserted that signing the Non-Proliferation Treaty was not in the interest of India or Pakistan even if China did so. Instead, he wanted the two countries to think of "capping" their nuclear capabilities and taking confidence-building measures. 

September-October saw three sets of visits significant for the general thrust of Pakistan's foreign policy-President Ghulam Ishaq Khan went to Iran and Saudi Arabia, PRC President Yang Shangkun visited Pakistan and Iran, and General Asif Nawaz made trips to China and Iran within a few weeks of taking over as COAS. Ishaq Khan, in his address to the Iranian Majlis, expounded the Islamic worldview, stressing the economic integration of the Ummah and resistance to international and regional hegemonism. The Chinese president, in all his speeches in Pakistan, demanded that the new world order be based on equality, justice, and the five principles of peaceful coexistence. Pakistan, China, and Iran-all under pressure from the United States- were reported in the Western media to be moving toward strategic consensus and some sort of a defense pact. No doubt the economic and technological cooperation among these states has made rapid strides in recent years, but to view it as an emerging Beijing-Islamabad-Tehran axis would be to give their cooperation a meaning that was not there. All three were trying to adjust to new trends and new realities of the international political system and to enhance their leverage in it.

Incumbents

Federal government 
President: Ghulam Ishaq Khan 
Prime Minister: Nawaz Sharif
Chief Justice: Muhammad Afzal Zullah

Governors 
Governor of Balochistan – Musa Khan (until 12 March); Gul Mohammad Khan Jogezai (starting 13 July)
Governor of Khyber Pakhtunkhwa – Amir Gulistan Janjua 
Governor of Punjab – Mian Muhammad Azhar 
Governor of Sindh – Mahmoud Haroon

Events 
 1991 – Pakistan and India sign the Rail Communication Agreement, also known as the "Samjhauta Express agreement".
 1991 – Retirement of the famed International Pakistani hockey player, Zahid Shareef.

June
5 June – In the Enforcement of Shari’ah Act, the government is given control over the actions of the Muslim population under Islamic law, also known as Shari'ah Law

October
 2 October – The Punjab subordinate judiciary service tribunal act is passed.

December
 A train travelling from Karachi to Lahore hits a parked freight train at Ghotki, killing over 100 of the 800 passengers.

Births 
 15 January – Rubab Raza, swimmer
 6 February – Sarah Mahboob Khan.
 16 March – Hammad Azam, cricketer.
 25 November – Muhammad Rizwan Jr.

Deaths 
Mahmood Hussain, cricketer.

Lt. Gen Fazle Haq was gunned down on 3rd October 1991 in Peshawar

See also
1990 in Pakistan
Other events of 1991
1992 in Pakistan
Timeline of Pakistani history
List of Pakistani films of 1991

References

 
1991 in Asia